William Lee McAllister Miller (1875 – 13 August 1915) was a Scottish professional footballer who played in the Football League for Grimsby Town as a centre forward.

Personal life 
Miller worked as a picture framer in Dumfries. He was initially presumed dead and was later commemorated on the Helles Memorial.

References

1915 deaths
Scottish footballers
English Football League players
Association football forwards
British Army personnel of World War I
King's Own Scottish Borderers soldiers
British military personnel killed in World War I
St Bernard's F.C. players
Grimsby Town F.C. players
Scottish Football League players
1875 births
Footballers from Dumfries
Deaths due to shipwreck at sea